Felix Neuhaus (10 April 1928 – 24 January 2022) was a Swiss wrestler. He competed in the men's freestyle middleweight at the 1952 Summer Olympics.

References

External links
 

1928 births
2022 deaths
Swiss male sport wrestlers
Olympic wrestlers of Switzerland
Wrestlers at the 1952 Summer Olympics
Place of birth missing